Scenic railroad (American English) or Scenic railway (British English) may refer to:
 Heritage railways operating leisurely train tours of sights such as  mountain scenery, historic areas, and foliage tours
 Scenic gravity railroad, early terminology for roller coasters
 Scenic railway (roller coaster design), early type of roller coaster
 Scenic Railway (Euclid Beach Park), a roller coaster
 Scenic Railway (Dreamland Margate), a roller coaster
 The Great Scenic Railway, a roller coaster at Luna Park Melbourne